Kanstantsin Dzehtsiarou is a scholar of human rights law who has worked for the University of Liverpool since 2015.

Works

References

Academics of the University of Liverpool
Living people
Place of birth missing (living people)
Year of birth missing (living people)